A pontifical university is an ecclesiastical university established or approved directly by the Holy See, composed of three main ecclesiastical faculties (Theology, Philosophy and Canon Law) and at least one other faculty. These academic institutes deal specifically with Christian revelation and related disciplines, and the Church's mission of spreading the Gospel, as proclaimed in the apostolic constitution Sapientia christiana. As of 2018, they are governed by the apostolic constitution Veritatis gaudium issued by Pope Francis on 8 December 2017.

Quality and ranking 
Pontifical universities follow a European system of study hour calculation, granting the baccalaureate, the licentiate, and the ecclesiastical doctorate. These ecclesiastical degrees are prerequisites to certain offices in the Roman Catholic Church, especially considering that bishop candidates are selected mainly from priests who are doctors of sacred theology (S.T.D.) or canon law (J.C.D.) and that ecclesiastical judges and canon lawyers must have at least the Licentiate of Canon Law (J.C.L.).

Pontifical colleges and universities are generally nondenominational, in that they accept anyone regardless of academic merit, religion or denominational affiliation, race or ethnicity, nationality, or civil status, provided the admission or enrollment requirements and legal documents are submitted, and the campus regulations are obeyed. However, some faculties or degrees and disciplines may be for Catholics only, and non-Catholics, whether Christian or not, may be exempted from participating in otherwise required campus activities, particularly those of a religious nature.

In 2003 the Holy See took part in the Bologna Process, a series of meetings and agreements between European states designed to foster comparable quality standards in higher education, and in the "Bologna Follow-up Group". Pope Benedict XVI established the Agency for the Evaluation and Promotion of Quality in Ecclesiastical Universities and Faculties (AVEPRO), an attempt to promote and develop a culture of quality within the ecclesiastical institutions and enable them to aim in developing internationally valid quality criteria.

Compared to secular universities, which are academic institutions for the study and teaching of a broad range of disciplines, ecclesiastical or pontifical universities are "usually composed of three principal ecclesiastical faculties, theology, philosophy, and canon law, and at least one other faculty. A pontifical university specifically addresses Christian revelation and disciplines correlative to the evangelical mission of the Church as set out in the apostolic constitution Sapientia christiana.

List of pontifical universities 

Argentina
 Pontifical Catholic University of Argentina, Buenos Aires

Austria 
 International Theological Institute, Schloss Trumau
 Pontifical Athenaeum, Heiligenkreuz Abbey, Heiligenkreuz

Belgium
 Katholieke Universiteit Leuven, Leuven
 Université catholique de Louvain, Louvain-la-Neuve

Bolivia
 The Royal and Pontifical Major University of Saint Francis Xavier of Chuquisaca

Brazil

 Pontifical Catholic University of Campinas, Campinas
 Pontifical Catholic University of Goiás, Goiânia
 Pontifical Catholic University of Minas Gerais, Belo Horizonte
 Pontifical Catholic University of São Paulo, São Paulo
 Pontifical Catholic University of Paraná, Curitiba
 Pontifical Catholic University of Rio de Janeiro, Rio de Janeiro
 Pontifical Catholic University of Rio Grande do Sul, Porto Alegre

Canada
Dominican University College, Ottawa
Pontifical Institute of Mediaeval Studies, Toronto
 Regis College, Toronto
 Saint Paul University, Ottawa

Chile
 Pontifical Catholic University of Chile, Santiago
 Pontifical Catholic University of Valparaiso, Valparaíso

Colombia
 Pontifical Bolivarian University, Medellín
 Pontifical Xavierian University, Bogotá

Dominican Republic
 Pontificia Universidad Católica Madre y Maestra, Santo Domingo, Santiago de Los Caballeros, and Puerto Plata.

Ecuador
 Pontificia Universidad Católica del Ecuador, Quito

France
 Institut Catholique de Paris, Paris
 Institut Catholique de Toulouse, Toulouse

Germany
 Catholic University of Eichstätt-Ingolstadt, Eichstätt & Ingolstadt
 Munich University of Philosophy, Munich

Guatemala
 Universidad de San Carlos de Guatemala, Guatemala City

India
 St. Peter's Pontifical Seminary, Bangalore

Ireland
 St Patrick's College, Maynooth, Maynooth; Pontifical University charter 1896
Can grant pontifical degrees.
 The Irish Dominican House of Studies(Studium) can grant pontifical degrees from the Angelicum, since 1971, originally from St. Mary's Priory but since 2000 from St. Saviour's Priory, Dublin.

Italy

(Pontifical Institutes and Faculties are listed in the Ecclesiastical Universities article, while here are the Pontifical Universities and Atheneum.)
 Pontifical Atheneum of St. Anselm (Anselmianum), Rome
 Pontifical Athenaeum Queen of the Apostles (Regina Apostolorum), Rome
 Pontifical Gregorian University (Gregoriana), Rome
 Pontifical Lateran University (Lateranensis), Rome
 Pontifical University of the Holy Cross (Santa Croce), Rome
 Pontifical University of St. Anthony (Antonianum), Rome
 Pontifical University of St. Thomas Aquinas (Angelicum), Rome
 Pontifical Urbaniana University (Urbaniana), Rome
 Salesian Pontifical University (Salesiana), Rome

Ivory Coast
 Université Catholique de l'Afrique de l'Ouest, Abidjan

Japan
 Sophia University (Jochi), Tokyo

Kenya
 Catholic University of Eastern Africa, Nairobi

Korea
 Sogang University, Seoul

Lebanon
 Holy Spirit University of Kaslik, Kaslik
 Saint Joseph University, Beirut

Mexico
 Pontifical University of Mexico, Mexico City
 Royal and Pontifical University of Mexico

Panama
 Universidad Católica Santa María La Antigua, Panama City

Paraguay
 Universidad Católica Nuestra Señora de la Asunción, Asuncion

Peru
 Royal and Pontifical University of San Marcos (UNMSM)
 Pontifical Catholic University of Peru, Lima

Philippines
 The Pontifical and Royal University of Santo Tomas, Manila

Poland
 Pontifical University of John Paul II, Krakow

Portugal
 Catholic University of Portugal, Lisbon

Puerto Rico
 Pontifical Catholic University of Puerto Rico, Ponce

Spain
 Comillas Pontifical University, Madrid
 Pontifical University of Salamanca, Salamanca & Madrid
 University of Navarra, Pamplona

Ukraine
 Superior Institute of Religious Sciences of St. Thomas Aquinas, Kyiv; since 1992. An institution of higher education in Kyiv (Ukraine), conducted by the Dominican Friars of the Vicariate General of Ukraine and affiliated to the Pontifical University of St. Thomas Aquinas (Angelicum).

United Kingdom
 Mater Ecclesiae College, St Mary's University, Twickenham, London; since 2019.

United States
 Catholic University of America, Washington, DC

Uruguay
 Universidad Católica del Uruguay Dámaso Antonio Larrañaga, Montevideo

Former pontifical universities
 Heidelberg University, Heidelberg, Germany, until the German Reformation
 Heythrop College, University of London; Bellarmine Institute, London, United Kingdom.
 Lund Studium Generale, Lund, Sweden, until the Danish Reformation
 Royal and Pontifical University of Córdoba, Córdoba, Argentina, until 1856, during the presidency of Justo José de Urquiza
 Royal and Pontifical University of Mexico, Mexico City, Mexico, until the Mexican War of Independence
 Sapienza University of Rome, Rome, Italy, until the Proclamation of the Kingdom of Italy in 1870. 
 Universidad Católica de Santo Tomás de Villanueva, Havana, Cuba, until 1961, after the Cuban Revolution
 Universidad de San Ignacio, Manila, Philippines, until 1768, after the Expulsion of the Jesuits
 Universidad Santo Tomás de Aquino, Santo Domingo, Dominican Republic (then in Haiti), until 1823, during the Unification of Hispaniola
 University of Aberdeen, Old Aberdeen, Scotland, until the Scottish Reformation
 University of Cambridge, Cambridge, England, until the English Reformation
 University of Cologne, Cologne, Germany, until the French Revolutionary Wars
 University of Copenhagen, Copenhagen, Denmark, until the Danish Reformation
 University of Erfurt, until the German Reformation
 University of Freiburg, until the Suppression of the Society of Jesus
 University of Glasgow, Glasgow, Scotland, until the Scottish Reformation
 University of Greifswald, Greifswald, Germany, until the German Reformation
 University of Leipzig, Leipzig, Germany, until the German Reformation
 University of Mainz, until the French Revolutionary Wars
 University of Oxford, Oxford, England, until the English Reformation
 University of Paris, Paris, France, until the French Revolution
 University of Rostock, Rostock, Germany, until the German Reformation
 University of Saint Andrews, Saint Andrews, Scotland, until the Scottish Reformation
 University of San Marcos, Lima, Peru, until the Peruvian War of Independence
 University of Tübingen, until the German Reformation
 University of Wittenberg, until the German Reformation
 University of Würzburg, Würzburg, Germany, until the Napoleonic Wars
 Uppsala University, Uppsala, Sweden, until the Swedish Reformation
 Milltown Institute of Theology and Philosophy, Dublin, Ireland. Pontifical Athenaeum (1968-2015)

Pontifical faculties

 School of Theology and Religious Studies, The Catholic University of America, Washington, DC
 Theological Faculty, Catholic-Theological Private University Linz, Linz
 Facoltà di Teologia di Lugano, Lugano
 Marianum Theological Faculty, Rome
 Pontifical Faculty at the University of Saint Mary of the Lake (Mundelein Seminary), Mundelein, IL
 Pontifical Faculty of the Immaculate Conception (PFIC), Dominican House of Studies, Washington, DC
 Wedabhakti Pontifical Faculty of Theology, Sanata Dharma University, Yogyakarta

Ecclesiastical faculties
 Loyola School of Theology, Ateneo de Manila University, Manila, Philippines
 Catholic Institute of Sydney, Sydney, Australia
 School of Canon Law, Catholic University of America

Pontifical colleges

A number of national Roman Colleges designated as Pontifical Colleges serve primarily as residence halls for seminarians sent by the bishops of a particular country to study there, such as the Belgian Pontifical College. They may also provide housing for priests pursuing advanced degrees. Students may take classes at the Gregorian, the Angelicum or other universities in Rome. In addition, other members of the clergy may reside there when in Rome.

See also 
 
 Catholic university
 Doctor of Canon Law
 Ecclesiastical university
 Licentiate of Sacred Theology
 List of Roman Catholic seminaries
 Pontifical universities in Rome

References

Sources 
 

 
 
Catholic universities and colleges
Types of university or college